Septentrinna is a genus of corinnid sac spiders first described by A. B. Bonaldo in 2000.

Species
 it contains six species:
Septentrinna bicalcarata (Simon, 1896) (type) – USA, Mexico
Septentrinna paradoxa (F. O. Pickard-Cambridge, 1899) – Guatemala
Septentrinna potosi Bonaldo, 2000 – Mexico
Septentrinna retusa (F. O. Pickard-Cambridge, 1899) – Guatemala
Septentrinna steckleri (Gertsch, 1936) – USA, Mexico
Septentrinna yucatan Bonaldo, 2000 – Mexico

References

External links
 Septentrinna at BugGuide

Araneomorphae genera
Corinnidae
Spiders of North America